Pyotr Sergeyevich Volodkin (born 4 March 1999) is a Russian football player. He plays for FC Forte Taganrog.

Club career
He made his debut in the Russian Football National League for FC Spartak-2 Moscow on 8 July 2017 in a game against FC Sibir Novosibirsk.

References

External links
 Profile by Russian Football National League

1999 births
Footballers from Moscow
Living people
Russian footballers
Association football midfielders
Russia youth international footballers
FC Spartak-2 Moscow players
FC Chayka Peschanokopskoye players